A total of 47 suicide attacks have occurred in Turkey, 24 of which were carried by PKK, 10 by the Islamic State of Iraq and the Levant, 6 by TAK, 4 by Revolutionary People's Liberation Party/Front, and 3 by Al-Qaeda's branch in Turkey. The assailants who carried out these attacks - except the one on 9 March 2003 and another on 25 May 2012 - all lost their lives, and a total of 593 people including 37 assailants were killed. 15 Suicide attacks have occurred in Istanbul, followed by 6 in Hakkâri, 5 in Ankara, 4 in Adana and Gaziantep, 3 in Van, 2 in Bingöl, Diyarbakır and Kayseri, and 1 in Ağrı, Antalya, Bursa, Elazığ, Sivas, Şanlıurfa, Şırnak and Tunceli. In addition to these attacks, a total of three attempted attacks, two by PKK and one by Revolutionary People's Liberation Party/Front, were not successfully carried out and the assailants lost their lives following the explosion of the explosives.

The first suicide attack in the country was carried out by the PKK in Tunceli on 30 June 1996. The attack targeting military personnel resulted in the death of 8 military personnel. On 25 October 1996, a civilian died in Adana for the first time in the second suicide attack carried out by the PKK that targeted the police. On 1 December 1998, for the first time, a place where civilians were concentrated was targeted in the attack organized by a PKK assailant on the market in Lice. In the attack organized by a PKK member in Van on 24 December 1998, for the first time a child died from such an attack in the country. While female assailants were used in the first 7 suicide attacks carried out by PKK members, male suicide attackers began to carry out attacks starting on 20 March 1999 with the attack in Başkale. The Revolutionary People's Liberation Party/Front organized its first suicide attack on 3 January 2001 in Istanbul. On 15 November 2003, Al-Qaeda organized its first suicide attack in the country, using bomb-laden vehicles on two separate targets in Istanbul and targeted places of worship for the first time. On 20 November, the same organization attacked two different targets in Istanbul using the same method, again with a few minutes apart. 28 people died in the first attack and 31 in the second one, making those attacks the deadliest suicide attacks in the country at that time. On 6 January 2015, a suicide attack was carried out in Istanbul by a person linked to the Islamic State of Iraq and the Levant. An assailant, who was affiliated with the same organization, killed 34 people in the attack on Suruç on 20 July 2015. On 10 October 2015, 109 people died in Ankara due to explosives detonated by two people at an interval of three seconds, and this event went down in history as the most fatal suicide attack in the history of the country. On 17 February 2016, a suicide attack was carried out in Ankara by TAK members for the first time. An airport in Turkey was targeted for the first time in the attack on Istanbul Atatürk Airport on 28 June 2016.

2016 was the year in which the most number of suicide attacks were carried out, with a total of 16 attacks. 318 were killed from the attacks in 2016, making it the year with the most number of fatalities.

List of suicide attacks 
Note: In all the attacks - except one attacker who survived the attack on 9 March 2003 and another on 25 May 2012 - the people who carried out the attacks lost their lives and are included the number of fatalities.

Suicide attack attempts

Notes 

A.  It does not include an attacker and an officer who died in the clash before the explosion. Another attacker and a civilian died from the explosion.
B.  The identity of the second attacker was not disclosed by the official authorities, and at first, some claims were made that he was Ömer Deniz Dündar. Ömer Deniz Dündar's father, Mehmet Dündar, made a statement that his son reached him via Facebook and conveyed the message that he was okay. On 10 January 2016, according to the information received by Anadolu Agency correspondent from Ankara Chief Public Prosecutor's sources, the identity of the attacker was reported as a Syrian citizen named "E. U." In the news published in Milliyet on 15 April, it was stated that the name of the attacker was Ebu Usema.
C.  Although there were no suicide attacks in 2004, two people that were injured in the attacks that took place in Istanbul on 15 and 20 November 2003 died from their injuries in 2004.
D.  Two people who were fatally injured on 10 December 2016 due to the attack in Istanbul, lost their lives in 2017 and 2019 respectively.

References

Further reading 

 

Suicide bombings in Turkey
Lists of events in Turkey
Terrorism in Turkey
Suicide attacks in Turkey
Suicide-related lists